Hannes Pichler was an Italian luger who competed from the mid-1980s to the early 1990s. A natural track luger, he won the gold medal in the men's doubles event at the 1990 FIL World Luge Natural Track Championships in Gsies, Italy.

References
Natural track World Championships results: 1979-2007

Italian male lugers
Living people
Year of birth missing (living people)
Italian lugers
Sportspeople from Südtirol
Germanophone Italian people